Bebearia chilonis is a butterfly in the family Nymphalidae. It is found in Cameroon, Gabon and the Democratic Republic of the Congo (Ubangi).

References

Butterflies described in 1874
chilonis
Butterflies of Africa
Taxa named by William Chapman Hewitson